"Outta Control" is a song by American rapper 50 Cent, recorded for his second studio album, The Massacre (2005). The song features production from Dr. Dre and Mike Elizondo. A remixed version of the song (although it bears no resemblance to the original) was released as the fourth and final single from The Massacre, although it is only included on the re-released version and replaces the original version. The remix is also produced by Dr. Dre and Elizondo and features a guest appearance from hip-hop group Mobb Deep. It also appears as a bonus track on Mobb Deep's seventh studio album Blood Money (2006).

Both versions of the song have "heavy" drum-based productions and also incorporate elements of strings throughout, although the remix is produced more sparsely than the original and also prominently features piano keys throughout. Lyrically, the songs are both largely about 50 Cent's ability to control the attitudes of people during his performances in clubs, describing how he has them "going outta control".

Due to confusion over which version of the song would be released as a single, both versions of the song charted on the Billboard Hot 100. Though the original peaked at #92 (digital sales alone), the remix was a significant success, peaking at #6 on the Billboard Hot 100 and charting in the upper regions of several national charts worldwide.

Background
The song was written by 50 Cent, Dr. Dre, Mike Elizondo, Prodigy, Havoc, Mark Batson, Chris Pope and Steve Standard, and produced by Dr. Dre and Mike Elizondo. It was originally released as "Outta Control" on the original version of The Massacre. This version was a completely different song, simply with the same title. However, when the album was set for re-release, the song became earmarked as the album's next single and was remade as "Outta Control Remix". The remix not only features Mobb Deep, but utilizes a different sample. However, no advanced single was released for "Outta Control Remix". This led to confusion among digital consumers who downloaded the original version of "Outta Control", causing it to chart concurrently with "Outta Control (Remix)".
The original version thus charted at #92 on the U.S. Billboard Hot 100, while the remix charted at #6, becoming 50 Cent's seventh top-ten solo single on the chart as the lead artist. It also marked his tenth top-ten single overall.

Music video
The shirts worn by some of the rappers in the music video have the words "GAME OVER" on them, symbolising The Game's departure from G-Unit. The video takes place in a club where 50 Cent & Mobb Deep have a phone call to decide where to meet. The video has cameos from G-Unit artists M.O.P, Tony Yayo, Olivia, Lloyd Banks, Spider Loc and Young Buck, as well as The Alchemist and Winky Wright.

Track listing
 UK CD single #1
 "Outta Control" (Remix featuring Mobb Deep)
 "Outta Control" (Album Version)

 UK CD single #2
 "Outta Control" (Remix featuring Mobb Deep)
 "Outta Control" (Album Instrumental)
 "Outta Control" (Remix Instrumental)
 "Outta Control" (Music Video)

Chart performance
Released in 2005, the single peaked at #6 in the U.S., where it became 50 Cent's seventh solo top-ten single and tenth overall. It also reached #7 in the UK and #6 in Canada. The original version, despite not being released as a single, peaked at #92 on the U.S. Billboard Hot 100.

Charts

Weekly charts

Original version

Remix featuring Mobb Deep

Year-end charts

Certifications

References

External links
 50 Cent's official site
 "Outta Control" lyrics

2005 singles
50 Cent songs
Mobb Deep songs
Song recordings produced by Dr. Dre
Songs written by 50 Cent
Songs written by Mark Batson
Songs written by Dr. Dre
2005 songs
Shady Records singles
Aftermath Entertainment singles
Interscope Records singles
Songs written by Mike Elizondo
Songs written by Havoc (musician)
Songs written by Prodigy (rapper)